2020 Emmy Awards may refer to:

 72nd Primetime Emmy Awards, the 2020 Emmy Awards ceremony honoring primetime programming during June 2019 – May 2020
 47th Daytime Emmy Awards, the 2020 Emmy Awards ceremony honoring daytime programming during 2020
 48th International Emmy Awards, the 2020 Emmy Awards ceremony honoring international programming 

Emmy Award ceremonies by year